The 1993 Tour de Hongrie was the 22nd edition of the Tour de Hongrie cycle race and was held from 27 July to 1 August 1993. The race started and finished in Budapest. The race was won by Jens Dittmann.

Route

General classification

See also

 1993 in sports

References

1993
Tour de Hongrie
Tour de Hongrie